The mesangylon was a javelin with a strap for throwing it by. Its name is attested, among others, in the works of Euripides, Polybius and Arrian. It is one of the weapons used in Alexander's experimental phalanx.

References

External links
 Perseus Greek Word Study Tool 

Ancient Greek military terminology
Ancient Greek military equipment
Ancient weapons
Javelins
Projectiles
Throwing weapons